Amir Hossain Babu was a Bangladeshi dancer and choreographer. He earned Bangladesh National Film Award for Best Choreography a record two times for his performance in the films Beporoya (1992) and Meghla Akash (2001).

Career
Babu was the first who discovered actor Ferdous Ahmed. In 1997, following the death of Salman Shah, he scheduled to make a dance based film named Nach Moyuri Nach. Since, Shah was dead untimely, he needed a new hero. So, he auditioned for a new hero and chose Ferdous for the role. The shooting began initially, but the film was shelved.

Filmography

References

External links
 

Bangladeshi male dancers
Bangladeshi choreographers
Best Choreography National Film Award (Bangladesh) winners
Place of birth missing
Date of birth missing
Place of death missing
Date of death missing